Pontiac Municipal Airport is a public use airport 3 miles north of Pontiac, Illinois. The airport is publicly owned by the City of Pontiac.

The airport has one runway: runway 6/24 is 5000 x 75 ft (1524 x 23 m) and made of asphalt.

For the 12-month period ending March 31, 2020, the airport had 27 aircraft operations per day, or about 10,000 per year. This is comprised or 96% general aviation and 4% air taxi. For the same time period, there are 17 aircraft based on the field: 15 single-engine and 2 multiengine.

The airport has an FBO offering services such as fueling, courtesy cars, rental cars, a lounge, and internet for transient pilots. Local pilots also have access to aircraft maintenance and rental as well as flight instruction and pilot supplies.

References 

Airports in Illinois